Gerard is an album by the Colorado band Gerard, led by singer/songwriter Gerard McMahon. It was recorded at Caribou Ranch in Colorado and was released in 1976. The album was produced by James William Guercio, who also produced Chicago's early albums.

Track listing
"Hello Operator"
"Lucky Ol' Me" 
"Fool Like Me" 
"Dame" 
"Silver Strings" 
"Who's Your Daddy-O?" 
"Remember Your Promises" 
"Good Yankee Boy" 
"Another Way to Say" 
"We Stand United"

Personnel
Gerard McMahon – vocals, piano, synthesizer, organ 
Ross Salomone – drums
Steve Sykes – guitar, percussion 
Hilliard Wilson – guitar (bass)
Lana Wilson – vocals (background)
Al Campbell – synthesizer, organ, keyboards, percussion 		 		
Richard Bolden – saxophone	
Shelley Gray  – vocals (background)
Tom Howard  – trumpet, flugelhorn	
Stan Rogers  – trombone

External links
www.artistdirect.com
[ www.allmusic.com]
 

1976 debut albums
Gerard McMahon albums
Albums produced by James William Guercio